Arbigny is a commune in the Ain department in the Auvergne-Rhône-Alpes region of eastern France.

Geography
Arbigny is some 20 km north of Mâcon and 40 km south by south-east of Chalon-sur-Saône. The commune can be accessed by the D933 from Sermoyer in the north passing through the centre of the commune and village and continuing south to Pont-de-Vaux. The D126 runs west from the village changing to the D163 at the border of the commune and continuing to Uchizy. There are two other hamlets in the commune - La Croix and La Varenne.  About 80% of the commune is farmland with the rest being the forested eastern part.

The western border of the commune is formed by the Saône river. In the north and east there are ponds which are drained by the Biel d'Etang Neuf and the Biel d'Etang Butière which flow west to the Saône.

History
The area has been occupied since prehistoric times. The village was known as Albiniacus in the Middle Ages.

Administration

List of mayors of Arbigny

Population

Sights

The remains of an old Fortified Chateau
A Napoleonic milestone dated 1808
A Stone marker commemorating the landing fields of the Royal Air Force during the Second World War, on the road to Uchizy just before the bridge over the Saône. The code name of the landing field was "JUNOT".
A Plaque honouring two young resistance fighters (Dupasquier and Clairmidi) murdered by the Nazis in 1944 at a place called "La Varenne".

Protected natural areas
The floodplains of the Saône valley have been classified as protected areas since 1994.

See also
Communes of the Ain department
Chizerots

References

External links
Arbigny on the old National Geographic Institute website 
Arbigny on Géoportail, National Geographic Institute (IGN) website 
Arbigny on the 1750 Cassini Map

Communes of Ain
Bresse